Elections for the Indian state of Jammu and Kashmir were held over October 1983.  The Jammu & Kashmir National Conference leader Farooq Abdullah was appointed Chief Minister.

Background
The 1983 Jammu and Kashmir elections cemented the political polarisation on religious lines after Indira Gandhi campaigned aggressively in the state, raising the bogey of a 'Muslim invasion' of the Jammu region, alluding to the Resettlement Bill passed by the-then National Conference government, which gave the state's residents who left for Pakistan before 1954 the right to return to the state, reclaim their properties, and resettle.

Result
Indira Gandhi's strategy yielded dividends in the 1983 state elections and the Congress won 26 seats, while the NC secured 46. Barring an odd constituency, all the victories of the Congress were in the Jammu and Ladakh regions, while National Conference swept the Kashmir Valley. The 1983 election established the model for any future Congress-NC alliance - the Congress allotting itself seats mainly in the Jammu and Ladakh regions, while the National Conference limiting itself to the Kashmir Valley.

Farooq Abdullah was sworn in as the Chief Minister Again.

Elected members

References

Bibliography
 
 
 
 
 

Jammu and Kashmir
1983
1983